Danny Leon "Ozzie" Osborn (born June 19, 1946) is an American former professional baseball player.

After his lone season in the majors, he was traded along with Ken Henderson and Dick Ruthven to the Atlanta Braves for Ralph Garr and Larvell Blanks on December 12, 1975.

References

External links

1946 births
Living people
Angeles de Puebla players
Asheville Tourists players
Baseball players from Missouri
Chicago White Sox players
Colorado Mesa Mavericks baseball players
Florida Instructional League Reds players
Gulf Coast Reds players
Indianapolis Indians players
Major League Baseball pitchers
Richmond Braves players
Tampa Tarpons (1957–1987) players
Tiburones de La Guaira players
American expatriate baseball players in Venezuela
Tigres de Aragua players
Trois-Rivières Aigles players
Sportspeople from Springfield, Missouri